Ben Lewis (born September 30, 1985) is a Canadian actor known for his role as the adult version of William Clayton in the last two seasons of Arrow. He also played Other Scott in Scott Pilgrim vs. the World and Bobby Beckonridge in Degrassi: The Next Generation.

Career 
Lewis graduated from the National Theatre School of Canada. One of his earliest roles was in a guest starring role as Teddy Jones Jr., a ranch hand who kills his father's murderers, on Murdoch Mysteries in 2009, but his biggest roles came in mid-2010 when he had a small role as Other Scott in the film Scott Pilgrim vs. the World and played Bobby Beckonridge in the tenth season of Degrassi: The Next Generation; in July 2010 he said that they were the biggest roles of his career up to that point.

Interviewed at the time, he said that before getting the part of Bobby in Degrassi he had auditioned for the Canadian rite-of-passage show several times without success, and that he had not been invited to the first round of auditions for Bobby because they had been looking for a younger actor, getting the chance to audition when they didn't find anyone. Bobby is an abusive boyfriend with some personal baggage, and Lewis said that co-star Annie Clark, who played Bobby's girlfriend Fiona, was the key to helping him perform this, saying: "Annie is the sweetest girl, and we got along really really well from the very beginning which really helps, especially when you’re dealing with such sensitive subject matter. You feel that you trust the other person, and you can really go there."

In Scott Pilgrim vs. the World, Lewis played Other Scott, the boyfriend of Scott Pilgrim's roommate Wallace Wells. Jeff Bayer's The Scorecard Review review of the film gave the cast of the film 10/10, noting that "Scott's bandmates are even better. Alison Pill, who you may remember from Milk and Ben Lewis as the other Scott, steal every moment they are on screen. It's just an amazing cast of characters that support this film". During the Scott Pilgrim vs. the World 10th anniversary livestream, Lewis tweeted that "[Scott Pilgrim] profoundly changed my life. [Edgar Wright] seeing fit to include me in this cast was an honour & the greatest vote of confidence a young actor could've asked for."

Lewis then had television roles in Designated Survivor, The Handmaid's Tale, Chasing Life and Suits. In 2018 he joined the DC Comics superhero television show Arrow in its seventh season as the recurring character William Clayton, and became a main character for the eighth and final season. Lewis' William is an adult version of the Arrow's son, portrayed as a child by Jack Moore, who appears in a future timeline.

In 2019 he finished filming a role in the upcoming movie The High Note. During the COVID-19 pandemic, Lewis joined Cameo to raise money for charities. He has also written and directed short films, including Apart from Everything and Zero Recognition, and wrote for the web series This Week Had Me Like.

In 2020 Lewis starred opposite his real-life husband Blake Lee in the romantic comedy television film The Christmas Setup.

Personal life 
Lewis is openly gay, and came out to his parents when he was seventeen. He is married to actor Blake Lee, whom he met in the Grauman's Chinese Theatre bathroom at the Scott Pilgrim vs. the World premiere after being told they had mutual friends. Lee had been attending as Aubrey Plaza's friend. Lewis and Lee began a long-distance relationship between Los Angeles and Toronto. They have a dog called Todd.

Lewis has publicly criticized the Marvel Cinematic Universe for not casting LGBT+ actors; in a 2019 interview with Attitude he said "How many fucking Avengers are there at this point, and not one gay actor in the bunch" – Attitude noted that Lewis overlooked Tessa Thompson, a queer actress who plays the bisexual Avenger Valkyrie, in his comments. In the same interview, Lewis praised the Arrow producers for "[giving] more out actors [...] a platform to succeed". His Arrow character was given a coming-out scene after Lewis specifically requested they write it into the show. In relation to Lewis' character coming out, magazine Out also lamented that the DC Extended Universe only had one queer character.

Filmography

Films

TV

References

External links 

1985 births
Living people
Canadian male film actors
Canadian male television actors
Canadian gay writers
Canadian gay actors
National Theatre School of Canada alumni
21st-century Canadian LGBT people